The Smithsonian Institution is an alternate history novel by Gore Vidal, first published in 1998. 

The novel is a fictional account of the adventures of "T." as he helps a group of scientists in the basement of the Smithsonian create the neutron bomb, and encounters historical figures such as President Abraham Lincoln, Charles Lindbergh, Eleanor Roosevelt and Mrs. Grover Cleveland.

Reviewer Merle Rubin advises readers to "skip this" Vidal novel and "spend more profitable time rediscovering the many and varied pleasures of his earlier novels".

References 

1998 American novels
American alternate history novels
Novels by Gore Vidal
Novels about museums
Smithsonian Institution
Little, Brown and Company books